Promontorium Archerusia (Latin for "Cape Archerusia") is a headland on the near side of the Moon. It separates the lunar mares of Mare Serenitatis and Mare Tranquilitatis.

Promontorium Archerusia was named by Johannes Hevelius and is a misspelling of Acherusia, a cape on the Black Sea near Heraclea in ancient Bithynia (now Karadeniz Ereğli in Turkey).

References

External links

Promontorium Archerusia at Moon Wiki

Mountains on the Moon